Legislative elections were held in Mexico on 1 July 1973. The Institutional Revolutionary Party won 189 of the 231 seats in the Chamber of Deputies. Voter turnout was 60.3%.

Results

References

Mexico
Legislative
Legislative elections in Mexico
July 1973 events in Mexico